Austin Lingo (born July 10, 1994) is an American mixed martial artist who competes in the Featherweight division of the Ultimate Fighting Championship.

Early life
Lingo began training in martial arts at a young age after his father found out he’d been involved in a street fight. Lingo started boxing, along with training Tae Kwon Do, Kickboxing, and Muay Thai. He became so enthralled in the latter that he went across the globe to train in the birthplace of Muay Thai, Thailand.

Mixed martial arts career

Early career
In his MMA debut at LFA 16, he defeated Charles Williams via unanimous decision. Lingo submitted Josh Foster in the first round via guillotine choke at Xtreme Knockout 39, before returning to Legacy Fighting Alliance, where he would spend the rest of his career on the regional scene. He would win his next 5 bouts under the banner; Omar Benjar via TKO in round one at LFA 33, Phil Gonzalez via unanimous decision at LFA 40, Aaron Webb via knock out in the first round at LFA 55, Angel Cruz via rear naked choke in the first round at LFA 62. In his final performance for the promotion, at LFA 73, Lingo faced Solo Hatley Jr., defeating him by knock out 25 seconds into the bout.

Ultimate Fighting Championship
In his promotional debut, Lingo faced fellow newcomer Youssef Zalal on February 8, 2020 at UFC 247. He lost the fight via unanimous decision.

Lingo faced Jacob Kilburn on January 16, 2021 at UFC on ABC: Holloway vs. Kattar. He won the bout in convincing fashion via unanimous decision.

Lingo faced Luis Saldaña on August 21, 2021 at UFC on ESPN: Cannonier vs. Gastelum. He won the fight via unanimous decision.

Lingo was scheduled to face Jonathan Pearce on February 19, 2022 at UFC Fight Night 201. However, Lingo pulled out due to undisclosed reasons.

Lingo was scheduled to face David Onama on July 9, 2022 at UFC on ESPN 39. However, Lingo pulled out during fight week.

Lingo was expected to face Ricardo Ramos in a featherweight bout on March 11, 2023 at UFC Fight Night 221. However, the bout was cancelled after Ramos weighed in at 154 pounds, eight pounds over the featherweight non-title fight limit.

Lingo is scheduled to face Nate Landwehr, replacing Alex Caceres,  on March 25, 2023 at UFC on ESPN 43.

Mixed martial arts record

|-
| Win
| align=center| 9–1
| Luis Saldaña
| Decision (unanimous)
| UFC on ESPN: Cannonier vs. Gastelum
| 
| align=center|3
| align=center|5:00
| Las Vegas, Nevada, United States
| 
|-
| Win
| align=center| 8–1
| Jacob Kilburn
|Decision (unanimous)
|UFC on ABC: Holloway vs. Kattar 
|
|align=center|3
|align=center|5:00
|Abu Dhabi, United Arab Emirates
| 
|-
| Loss
| align=center| 7–1
| Youssef Zalal
| Decision (unanimous)
|UFC 247
|
| align=center| 3
| align=center| 5:00
|Houston, Texas, United States
|
|-
| Win
| align=center| 7–0
| Solo Hatley Jr.
|KO (punches)
| LFA 73
| 
|align=center|1
|align=center|0:25
| Dallas, Texas, United States
|
|-
| Win
| align=center|6–0
|Angel Luis Cruz
|Technical Submission (rear-naked xhoke)
|LFA 62
|
|align=center|1
|align=center|0:25
|Dallas, Texas, United States
|
|-
| Win
| align=center|5–0
|Aaron Webb
|KO (punches)
| LFA 55
|
|align=center|1
|align=center|0:13
|Dallas, Texas, United States
|
|-
| Win
| align=center| 4–0
| Phil Gonzalez
|Decision (unanimous)
|LFA 40
| 
| align=center| 3
| align=center| 5:00
| Dallas, Texas, United States
|
|-
| Win
| align=center|3–0
| Omar Benjar
|TKO (punches)
|LFA 33
|
|align=center|1
|align=center|2:26
|Dallas, Texas, United States
|
|-
| Win
| align=center| 2–0
| Josh Foster
| Submission (guillotine choke)
|XKO 39
|
| align=center|1
| align=center|0:35
|Dallas, Texas, United States
|
|-
| Win
| align=center|1–0
| Charles Williams
| Decision (unanimous)
| LFA 16
|
|align=center|3
|align=center|5:00
|Dallas, Texas, United States
| 
|-

See also 
 List of current UFC fighters
 List of male mixed martial artists

References

External links 
  
 

1994 births
Living people
American male mixed martial artists
Featherweight mixed martial artists
Mixed martial artists utilizing taekwondo
Mixed martial artists utilizing Muay Thai
Mixed martial artists utilizing Brazilian jiu-jitsu
Ultimate Fighting Championship male fighters
American male taekwondo practitioners
American Muay Thai practitioners
American practitioners of Brazilian jiu-jitsu